Elmer F. Madar (November 28, 1920 – February 9, 1972) was an All American football player at the University of Michigan in 1942 and 1946.

Life and career
Born in Sykesville, Pennsylvania, Madar played football at Northeastern High School in Detroit.  He was a backup quarterback for the University of Michigan in 1941 and moved to end in 1942 where he played in 10 games, scored two touchdowns and made 12 receptions for 160 yards. He was part of the 1942 Michigan line with Merv Pregulman, Julius Franks, Al Wistert, Bob Kolesar, Bill Pritula and Phil Sharpe that was known as the "Seven Oak Posts," due to their reputation for not using substitutes. He served in the Air Corps during World War II, but returned to the University of Michigan after the war.  In 1946, he played in more minutes than any other player on Fritz Crisler's football team.  In December 1946, he was named to the Associated Press All-American team, and he was the first pick in the 1947 All-America Football Conference draft by the Miami Seahawks.  Madar played one year with the Baltimore Colts in 1947.  In March 1948, he was hired as the end coach at Harvard University, working with fellow Michigan alum and head coach Arthur Valpey.  He was assistant coach for the Holy Cross Crusaders in 1952 and 1953 but resigned in 1954 to seek a coaching job closer to his Michigan home.  He subsequently became a teacher in the Detroit public schools. His sister was Olga Madar.

Madar died of gunshot wounds in 1970 at his brother's house in Detroit.  Police reported that the wounds were believed to be self inflicted.

See also
 List of Michigan Wolverines football All-Americans

References

External links
 Bentley Library biography and photograph

1920 births
1972 deaths
Harvard Crimson football coaches
Holy Cross Crusaders football coaches
Michigan Wolverines football players
Baltimore Colts (1947–1950) players
United States Army personnel of World War II
United States Army Air Forces soldiers
Northeastern High School (Michigan) alumni
People from Jefferson County, Pennsylvania
Players of American football from Detroit
Players of American football from Pennsylvania